Aitchison College is an independent, semi-private boys school for boarding and day students from grade 1–13 in Lahore, Pakistan. It has a tradition of providing an education that uses academics, sports, and co-curricular activities as tools for character development. The school follows a curriculum designed to culminate in the International General Certificate of Education and AS Level/A Level qualifications and is geared towards preparing students for university education. The institute is the only Pakistani school that is a member of the G30 Schools of the World. Aitchison has educated former Prime Ministers, Imran Khan, former President Farooq Leghari, lawyers, cricketers, and politicians.

It was originally formed on 2 January 1886 in then British India, as the Punjab Chiefs' College and was renamed Aitchison College on 13 November 1886. However, the inception of the college can be traced back to 1868 as the Wards School in Ambala, after which it became Chiefs' College in Lahore.

Introduction
On 3 November 1886, the Viceroy Earl of Dufferin and Ava laid the foundation stone of the main building. The building was designed by Bhai Ram Singh and built by Sir Ganga Ram, one a leading architect and the other a leading builder of that time.

The college is named after the then Lt. Governor of the Punjab, Sir Charles Umpherston Aitchison, who, addressing the students in 1888, said:

Wards at Ambala
The history of Aitchison College goes back to the Ward's School at Ambala Cantonment which was envisioned in 1864 by Captain Tighe, then D.C. of Ambala. Established in 1868, it was originally intended for the education of young princes of the area but on the insistence of Sir Henry Davies - the Lieutenant Governor of Punjab, it widened its scope in 1874 to cater for the education of all the other heirs of the Princely states living in other parts of Punjab. The present constitution of Aitchison College is still based on the set of rules framed for the Wards' School.

Because of this seamless history from the "Wards School" to the "Chiefs' College" to the "Aitchison College" the school is arguably 150 years old in 2018.

Chief's College

The growing interest in the college prompted efforts by Lt. Gen Sir Charles Umpherston Aitchison, after whom the college is named, to expand the Government Wards School into Chiefs College. North Mian Meer Road was initially selected as the new site for Chiefs College and collaboration between Bhai Ram Singh, Vice Principal of Mayo School of Arts and Colonel Sir Samuel Swinton Jacob, Executive Engineer at Jeypore came up with an architectural design for the college. Even at its beginning, the college was designed to have a science laboratory, library and museum besides classrooms and amenities for students. Under the auspices of the new staff, including the first Principal W. A. Robinson and the famous Urdu poet Altaf Hussain Hali, Chiefs College began educating a modest first batch of 12 boys, who were temporarily accommodated at Abbot Road while construction was in progress. The college was formally inaugurated by the Viceroy, the Earl of Dufferin and Ava on 3 November 1886.

Aitchison College
On 13 November 1886, a few days after the foundation stone of Chiefs College was laid, the school was renamed Aitchison College. Construction of the main building, now known as the Old Building, began in 1887 and was finished in 1890, along with a gymnasium and a hospital. Soon after that, the main building became the centre of academic life at Aitchison, moving classes away from their previous locations in the boarding houses and rented bungalows. Construction on other buildings continued as the school attracted more wards and princes.

Several efforts were made to provide facilities for physical education. In 1896, a cricket pavilion was built, and work began on a polo field. A year later, training in cricket, football, field hockey, and tennis was started. Following Aitchison's win in local sports competitions, the Aitchison Challenge Cup was established to honour the best sportsmen each year. In 1905, ACOBA (Aitchison College Old Boys Association) was established to allow the alumni of the school to compete against the current students in an event that brought together the alumni each year. In 1907, Aitchison College started sending contingents of sports teams to compete with schools outside Lahore and was allowed to host contingents from other schools. Swimming facilities were developed in 1923 and the Rani of Mandi Cup was established to honour the best swimmer of the year. The sports system soon evolved as competitions between the houses began in 1928. Hockey and tennis courts were established in 1938.

The school also offers several extra-curricular activities and awards. In the first half of the 20th century, the school began to offer awards to some of its top students, the most popular of which were those for best essay writer and best debater. Additionally, the first Rivaz medal for a best-leaving boy at Aitchison College was created in 1906. The school also first published "Pioneer" publication in 1936. The Prize Distribution Day ceremony, now known as Founders Day, held annually in May, was started in 1892. The Prize Distribution was later divided into two separate ceremonies: Founders Day Academics and Founders Day Sports.

The school also has a history of providing religious education and housing. A mosque was constructed for the religious education of Muslim students in 1900, and a Dharamshala was created in 1913. A separate Sikh mess was organized in 1907, followed by the creation of a separate kitchen for Halal food in 1938. A Hindu temple was also constructed, which was later redesigned to hold the principal's office. Religious education was later made compulsory for Hindu and Sikh students. Until 1933, the school enforced a rule that separate boarding houses should exist for Muslims, Hindus, and Sikhs.

Aitchison College has also changed its building make-up over the years. A separate building for the Preparatory School, which now holds classes for grades 7–9, was constructed in 1915, and the prefects system was established two years later. The school became affiliated with Cambridge University in 1933. In 1935, the policy of admission was broadened to include ordinary boys from surrounding areas. Following this policy, a separate house, Jubilee, was established for day boys. Classes for grades 9–13 were shifted from the main building to the newly constructed Barry Block (Senior School) in 1948. Following the independence of Pakistan in 1947, Muhammad Ali Jinnah was appointed Patron in Chief of the college in 1948. A separate building for Junior School, for Grades 1–5, was built in 1964. The war between India and Pakistan in 1965 disrupted school activities for a while but the normal school year resumed soon after the cease-fire. A number of modern buildings were constructed on the campus near the end of the 20th century, including an amphitheatre, a large library, computer and science laboratories, housing for staff members, a riding school, and squash and basketball courts.

The college has been honoured with the commemorative postage stamp by Pakistan Post, for successfully completing the 125 years of excellence.

Schooling system
Aitchison College is divided into 3 major divisions, Junior, Prep, and Senior School. All work in a connected manner but have some changes to them accordingly.

Each division accepts day scholars and boarding house students. Day scholars are also put into houses to increase competition. Each house has 1 Captain, 1 Vice-Captain, and 2 Prefects all of which are selected from their house's senior most class. Each division is under one Headmaster/Headmistress. Each year a school book is published and distributed to all students. Each book is custom to each division. 4 editors are chosen to edit and compile the book. Each subject has its own editorial board. Each year a founder's day is held which is 2 days long. The first day is reserved for sports competitions such as 100m race, relay race, javelin throw, high jumps, etc. The second day is reserved for prize distribution to winners of different categories.

Junior School
Junior School accommodates students from class K1-K6. Letter K is added before the class number and the section afterwards. K representing Kindergarten. Class 1 is only available to boarders having only 2 sections (K1-A and K1-B). From class 2-6, sections use the names of precious gems stones as section. eg. K6 Ruby, K3 Diamond, K4 Emerald. This naming convention has only recently been adopted after the Covid-19 pandemic. Before this naming convention, letters were user. eg. K6-C, K4-H, K3-B. In each class there is a respective Coordinator. Junior school is further divided into 2 main group, Lower Primary and Upper Primary. Lower Primary being of classes 1-3 and upper primary being of classes 4-6. Lower and Upper primaries have their own respective heads. The whole of Junior School is under on Headmaster/Headmistress with the current headmistress being Ms. Fatima Mubeen. Classes K1-K5 have the option of an in-school boarding school option in a house named Gwyn House. K6 has the option of boarding in their Saigol House. Day boys are also divided in to respective day-houses to increase competition between them.

Prep school
Prep school is also known as preparatory school. It houses students form class 7-9. Class 7 students have their classes names starting with "E" E standing for elementary eg. E2. Class 8 and 9 students have their classes names starting with "M" standing for Middle. eg. M1, M2. Prep school makes learning a foreign language compulsory for all students. Foreign languages include Arabic, Chinese, French, German, and Persian. Students are put in sections according to their chosen language. eg. M2-C1 (Middle 2-Chinese 1), E2-F1 (Elementary 2-French 1). Numbers are put in the end to accommodate the large numbers of students in a respective language. The most chosen language being French which has 4 section in each class. Clubs and Societies are practices in Prep school. Some societies include English Dramatic Society, Scrabble Society, Mathematics Society, Science Society, Robotics Society, etc. Each society organizer chooses 1 president from the M2 class, 2 Chief Executives form M2/M1 classes and 8 Executive Members from the E2 class.

Senior school
Senior school focuses on the Cambridge IGCSE studies for their IGCSE exams, Class divisions are Pre C1, C1, C2, H1, H1. C standing for Cambridge and H standing for Higher. Pre C1 houses students who graduate from prep school's M2 near March. Students are put into sections according to the subjects that they have selected for higher studies. eg. Students who chose Biology-0610, Chemistry-0620, Physics-0625, Additional Math-0606 would be grouped in one section, C1-B. It offers National Curriculum and Inter-National Curriculum. For international curriculum students are not required to have a Visa of a foreign country.

See also
 La Martiniere Lucknow
 Eton College
 Mayo College
 Lawrence School, Sanawar
 Doon School
 Harrow School
 Bishop Cotton School (Shimla)
 Karachi Grammar School
 Daly College
 Scindia School

References

Further reading
 L. F. Loveday Prior, Punjab Prelude, London: John Murray, 1952.
 John Hill, Maharajas in the Making: Life at the Eton of India 1935-40, Sussex: Book Guild, 2001.
 F. S. Aijazuddin, Commanding Success, Lahore, 2011.
 Zill Niazi, Reliving Aitchison: A Modern Photographic History, Lahore, 2019.

External links

Official website

 
Boarding schools in Pakistan
Schools in Lahore
Cambridge schools in Pakistan
Private schools in Pakistan
Academic institutions in Pakistan
 
Cricket grounds in Pakistan
1886 establishments in British India
British colonial architecture
The Mall, Lahore
Education in Lahore